Aphelinoidea is a genus of wasps belonging to the family Trichogrammatidae.

The genus has almost cosmopolitan distribution.

Species

Species:

Aphelinoidea accepta 
Aphelinoidea anatolica 
Aphelinoidea bischoffi

References

Trichogrammatidae
Hymenoptera genera